Thomas Vinciguerra  (October 8, 1963 – February 22, 2021) was an American journalist, editor, and author. A founding editor of The Week magazine, he published about popular culture and other subjects in The New York Times, as well as in The Wall Street Journal, The New Yorker and GQ.

Background
Thomas Viniguerra was born on October 8, 1963.  His parents William Vinciguerra and Aurora Locicero were public school teachers in Levittown, New York for four decades.  Raised in Garden City, New York, he attended Columbia College, where he was an editor of the Columbia Daily Spectator and was involved with The Varsity Show.  Graduating in 1985 with a BA in history, he continued studies on campus, receiving his MS from the Graduate School of Journalism at Columbia University the following year.  While at the Journalism School he refounded the Philolexian Society, Columbia's oldest student organization; he was subsequently designated its "Avatar."  In 1990, he received an MA in English from the Columbia University Graduate School of Arts and Sciences.

Career
From 1987 to 1998, Vinciguerra served as an editor at Columbia College Today, the college's alumni publication. He joined The Week upon inception in 2001 through 2010. Subsequently, he was executive editor of Indian Country Today Media Network.

Vinciguerra was editor of Conversations with Elie Wiesel (Schocken, 2001) and Backward Ran Sentences: The Best of Wolcott Gibbs from The New Yorker (Bloomsbury, 2011).   Pulitzer Prize-winning book critic Jonathan Yardley of The Washington Post selected Backward Ran Sentences as one of his 11 best books of 2011.  In November 2015, he published the original volume Cast of Characters: Wolcott Gibbs, E.B. White, James Thurber and the Golden Age of the New Yorker (W.W. Norton), which chronicles the early years of the New Yorker magazine.  He appeared on the History Channel, NY1, Fox News, John Batchelor Show, and the Leonard Lopate Show, among other venues.

Death and legacy
Thomas Vinciguerra died at the age of 57 on February 22, 2021. He is buried at Pine Lawn Memorial Park in Farmingdale, NY.

Ronald Wilmer, Columbia Class of 1986, wrote:    Tom, who was a graduate of Columbia College, the Journalism School and the Graduate School of Arts and Sciences, was a valued member of the Columbia community.  He frequently contributed to Columbia Magazine and Columbia College Today...  Late last year, Columbia University Press published Tom’s last book: an anthology, which he edited, called A Community of Scholars: Seventy-Five Years of The University Seminars at Columbia.  It’s a fitting final work for a writer who earned three degrees at Columbia.    Audere magazine remembered Vinciguerra as "Embracing his Weird":    Vinciguerra’s writing talents were spectacular and effortless, but he veered to the obscure. During his college years, at Columbia, he enthusiastically revived the long-dead "Philolexian" debating society, which thanks to his enthusiastic, not entirely un-weird efforts, survives to this day.  Indeed, Vinciguerra embraced his own weirdness without apology.  When Time Magazine published an anonymous photograph of him during the 1980s and called him a "trekkie," he sternly wrote them a correction: he was a "trekker," he insisted, not a "trekkie," a distinction that only a trekkie could possibly have known.

Works 

Books:
 Conversations with Elie Wiesel (Schocken, 2001) 
 Backward Ran Sentences: The Best of Wolcott Gibbs from The New Yorker (Bloomsbury, 2011)
 Cast of Characters: Wolcott Gibbs, E.B. White, James Thurber and the Golden Age of the New Yorker (W.W. Norton, 2015)

Books Edited:
 A Community of Scholars:  Seventy-Five Years of The University Seminars at Columbia (2020)

Articles:
 Daily Beast
 New York Times
 Wall Street Journal

References

External links
 WW Norton- Cast of Characters:  Wolcott Gibbs, E.B. White, James Thurber and the Golden Age of the New Yorker
 Daily Beast -  November 14, 2015 excerpt from Cast of Characters: where thurber and co knocked it back]
 Writers Rep -  Bio
 New Yorker -  Interview on October 10, 2011]
 WNYC - Interview on Leonard Lopate Show Dec 28, 2015
 Columbia Review of Journalism -  Bio

1963 births
2021 deaths
Writers from New York (state)
20th-century American writers
21st-century American writers
20th-century American male writers
Columbia College (New York) alumni
The New Yorker people